Chen Fang (Chinese: 陈放; born 19 October 1983) is a Chinese sports shooter. She competed in the women's trap event at the 2016 Summer Olympics.

References

External links
 

1983 births
Living people
Chinese female sport shooters
Olympic shooters of China
Shooters at the 2016 Summer Olympics
Place of birth missing (living people)
Asian Games silver medalists for China
Asian Games medalists in shooting
Shooters at the 2014 Asian Games
Universiade medalists in shooting
Medalists at the 2014 Asian Games
Universiade gold medalists for China
Universiade silver medalists for China
Medalists at the 2015 Summer Universiade
21st-century Chinese women